Wuhe station is a station for Line 5 and Line 10 of the Shenzhen Metro. Line 5 platforms opened on 22 June 2011 and Line 10 platforms opened on 18 August 2020.

Station layout

Exits

References

Shenzhen Metro stations
Railway stations in Guangdong
Longgang District, Shenzhen
Railway stations in China opened in 2011